Darryl K. Williams (January 28, 1964 - March 28, 2010) of Roxbury, Boston, Massachusetts and Milton, Massachusetts was an advocate for social justice, compassion and forgiveness as well as a local advocate for accessibility for persons with disabilities. As a 15-year-old African-American living in Roxbury, Boston, Massachusetts, Williams became the victim of a school shooting on September 28, 1979, in Charlestown, Boston, Massachusetts while playing at a high school football game. Williams survived the shooting but was paralyzed from the neck down for the rest of his life. Protests, rallies and school walkouts ensued in response, and racial tensions in the city of Boston escalated in the aftermath.

Despite the misfortunes, Williams earned a high school diploma and a college degree. He spoke to many thousands of Boston area high school students and others about gun violence and social justice in sports. Along the way, Darryl was awarded full scholarships to attend college and many civic honors for his advocacy efforts. Williams over the decades helped countless high school students and adults in and around Boston learn to accept people of all races.

Early life 
Williams was born in Boston on January 28, 1964. His family included his mother and one sister with whom he lived all his life. Growing up in the neighborhood of Roxbury within the city of Boston in Massachusetts, Williams attended services at Eliot Congregational Church which was walking distance from their home. As a teenager in the late 1970s, he attended Jamaica Plain High School. The high school was not his first choice, but because of court ordered school busing in effect at the time in Boston he was assigned there. As a sophomore, he played for the school's varsity football team. He liked playing guitar and dreamed of becoming a college and a professional football player one day.

School shooting 

On Friday, September 28, 1979, Darryl Williams was playing for the first time as a wide receiver on Jamaica Plain High School's (JP) football team. The JP team traveled to the neighborhood of Charlestown in Boston, Massachusetts to play against Charlestown High School. In the city of Boston, court ordered school busing since the mid-1970s were exacerbating notable racial tensions, and the  neighborhood of Charlestown was considered inhospitable to African American teenagers such as Williams. The ethnic makeup of Charlestown High School at the time was mostly working class Irish and other Europeans whereas at Jamaica Plain High School the makeup was more diverse with many African Americans as well as European Americans. The respective football teams reflected this difference. Despite the differences and tensions, the teams met and began playing.

Late in the 2nd quarter, Williams caught his first pass ever in a high school varsity football game.  His reception led to a score for Jamaica Plain High School.  The 2nd quarter ended soon afterward, and it was halftime.  The team opted to stay outside during halftime instead of going to the guest locker room.  Williams and his team huddled together near the end zone, celebrated Williams' reception and their 6–0 lead.  The football coach started giving a pep talk.

Meanwhile, across the street about 300 yards away, three Irish American teenage boys living in a nearby housing project perched on the roof of an empty apartment building.  One of the teenagers had recently found a loaded pistol and was ready to test it.  He fired the gun once in the direction of the football field.  The shooter later claimed to be aiming at pigeons, but one of the other boys disputed this.

The noise from the shot echoed against nearby buildings.  The bullet went between Williams' shoulder pads and helmet and lodged in the back of his neck.  Darryl fell to the ground unconscious in front of his teammates.  Darryl's teammates, fearing more shooting, fell to the ground as well. One of the teammates noticed Darryl was unconscious and called out for help.

Aftermath 
Emergency responders arrived immediately and put Williams into an ambulance.   The ambulance took Williams to Boston City Hospital in the South End neighborhood of Boston for treatment even though Massachusetts General Hospital in the West End was much closer.  When Williams awoke in the hospital, he was unable to feel anything below his neck.  Darryl was paralyzed from the neck down and reliant on a wheelchair for the rest of his life.

Responses 
The mayor of Boston at the time, Kevin White, vowed to find the perpetrators and ordered the Boston Police Department to start a massive manhunt.  After two days, police found and arrested the three teenagers, including the shooter.

On Monday, October 1, 1979, three days after the shooting Pope John Paul II arrived in Boston for an historic pastoral visit.  Outside the Cathedral of the Holy Cross in the South End neighborhood of Boston, about 1800 African Americans protested the Williams shooting as the pope arrived there on a rainy day.  During the evening Mass on Boston Common held by the pope, Cardinal Medeiros of Boston and 400,000 other attendees, a special prayer was added to the service for Darryl's recovery.  Two days later, on October 3 a large rally of thousands of adults and high school students was held in front of City Hall in support of Williams. Several local and state politicians visited Darryl and his mother at Boston City Hospital during his recovery there and promised their support.  Boston's mayor Kevin White and other local, state and federal officials promised the Williams family long-term financial help, but over the decades that help was limited to Medicare, private donations and fundraisers.

With racial tensions and fears of more violence, Charlestown High School did not play another home football game for nine years. In Jamaica Plain High School's 1981 yearbook, it is noted that a Darryl Williams week was commemorated at the school in Williams' honor.

The Freedom House of Roxbury, Massachusetts purchased a wheelchair accessible home in the nearby town of Milton, Massachusetts in the early 1980s and offered it to Williams and his family.  Williams moved into the home with his family and stayed there until the time of his death.

The 3 teenage suspects were charged in the shooting and sent home after posting bail.  The two older suspects including the shooter were tried as adults, convicted and sentenced to 10 years in prison.  The youngest one was tried in juvenile court and acquitted.  While in prison, the shooter told an interviewer that he was aiming at pigeons, not people.  Williams and his family disputed the shooter's claim, and at one point the youngest told a reporter that they were not shooting at birds.

Adult life 
During a time of racial tensions, Darryl and his family opted not to use inflammatory rhetoric which could lead to more violence.  Instead, he preached forgiveness whenever he could, and he advocated for peace and racial harmony.  About the shooting, Williams said, "White people did not shoot me.  Three white people shot me." Richard Lapchick, who also knew Nelson Mandela well, described Williams as "'America's lesser-known Nelson Mandela.' Like Mandela, he had every reason to hate white people. Instead, he loved all people."

Education and career 
Williams attended the Massachusetts Hospital School (Pappas Rehabilitation School in Canton, Massachusetts) and earned a high school degree from Boston Public Schools.  With the help of a President's Scholarship, he then earned a bachelor's degree from Northeastern University in Boston.  Darryl was given a computer which responded to his verbal commands so that he could write.  Joe Malone, the Massachusetts State Treasurer in the 1990s, gave Williams a job at the Massachusetts State Lottery where he worked as an operations manager then a computer programmer for many years.

Rights advocacy 
Richard E. Lapchick, a former professor at Northeastern University in Boston, Massachusetts and a longtime friend of Darryl Williams, described Darryl in an ESPN.com article as an advocate for social justice, compassion and forgiveness in a city that faced racial tensions throughout his lifetime.  Lapchick related to Williams as both Lapchick and Lapchick's father were the victims of sports related hate crimes. In 1984, Lapchick hired Williams as a motivational speaker.  Williams spoke to thousands of high school students about compassion, understanding and forgiveness in the face of violence in schools and racial tensions in Boston.

He also advocated often for wheelchair accessibility in public places. He made friends with newspaper writers such as Dan Shaughnessy of the Boston Globe, Joe Fitzgerald of the Boston Herald and sports figures such as boxer Muhammad Ali.  Ali called Darryl the "Second Greatest" after visiting him in 1991.

End of life 
Williams died in his sleep at his home in Milton on March 28, 2010. Since then, several articles about Williams' life and accomplishments have been written by sports writers and several others.  Richard Lapchick started a memorial fund in memory of Darryl Williams to help his family.  In 2012, when Darryl's mother and sister were faced with foreclosure on their Milton home, Lapchick reopened the fund and the contributions from the Boston area to the fund was enough to pay off a quarter of the mortgage.

Literary works 
Williams wrote two unpublished works which are generally autobiographical:

 "An Inadvertent Hero", registered at the United States Copyright Office, and 
 "Triumphant" an unfinished memoir.

References 

1964 births
2010 deaths
Activists from Massachusetts
People from Roxbury, Boston
American disability rights activists
African-American activists
People with tetraplegia
People from Milton, Massachusetts